The Aviators Code Initiative (ACI), formerly the Aviators Model Code of Conduct, is a set of model recommended practices designed to improve general aviation safety and airmanship.

Overview
Developed by a group of aviation professionals, the voluntary Aviators Code Initiative has produced a family of  voluntary aviation codes. For example, the Aviators Model Code of Conduct (AMCC) "recommends operating practices to enhance the quality and safety" of general aviation flight operations. The AMCC described behaviors that pilots and mechanics should exercise as good aviation citizens, including:

 making safety the highest priority;
 seeking excellence in airmanship;
 recognizing and managing risks effectively, and using sound principles of risk management;
 developing and exercising good judgment; and sound principles of aeronautical decision-making;
 maintaining situational awareness, and adhering to prudent operating practices and personal operating parameters;
 aspiring to professionalism;
 acting with responsibility and courtesy; and
 adhering to applicable laws and regulations.

The ACI family of codes is designed to be adapted by its implementers. It currently consists of eight volumes:

 Aviation Maintenance Technicians Model Code of Conduct
 Aviators Model Code of Conduct
 Designated Pilot Examiners Model Code of Conduct
 Flight Instructors Model Code of Conduct
 Flight Safety in the Drone Age (for manned aircraft pilots)    
 Glider Aviators Model Code of Conduct
 Helicopter Pilots Model Code of Conduct
 Light Sport Aviators Model Code of Conduct
 Seaplane Pilots Model Code of Conduct
 Student Pilots Model Code of Conduct
 Unmanned Aircraft Systems Pilots Code (UASPC)

The Flight Instructors Model Code of Conduct in particular has been embraced by the aviation education community. Retired airline captain and aviation author Barry Schiff notes that "It is an outstanding document that belongs in every instructor's flight kit." The FAA Safety Briefing characterizes the AMCC as "Guiding Principles for Instructors". Participants in the Master Instructor Continuing Education Program are required "to subscribe to and abide by an aviation educator's code of conduct" and are provided with examples that include three volumes of the AMCC. The Society of Aviation and Flight Educators provides links to several volumes of the AMCC in the Public Resource Center on its website. Additionally, the FAA introduces the AMCC in the "Instructor Responsibilities and Professionalism" chapter of its Aviation Instructor's Handbook.

Examples of the AMCC being promoted by and adapted to other sectors in general aviation include the Lake Elsinore Soaring Club, the Lancair Owners & Builders Organization, Gyroplane Aviators, and the Civil Air Patrol.

In January 2013, The Aviators Model Code of Conduct for Kids was released to "introduce students to what it takes to be a good pilot, to fly safely, and be a good passenger if they take a ride in a small plane." In June 2016, AMCC released Flight Safety in the Drone Age, offering safety guidance when operating near drones. The UAS Pilots Code was released in January 2018 to provide guidance for unmanned aircraft pilots and operators.

Permanent Editorial Board
This non-profit's volunteer Permanent Editorial Board (PEB) provides "editorial oversight and stewardship of the Aviators Code Initiative (ACI), implementation of the family of codes of conduct, and supporting materials." Current members include:
 Michael S. Baum, JD, MBA, ATP, Principal, Ind. Monitoring, LLC
 Ric Peri, Vice President, Government & Industry Affairs, Aircraft Electronics Association
 Bill Rhodes, Ph.D., Lt. Col USAF (ret.), Aerworthy Consulting, LLC
 Stan Rose, Aviation Executive and Safety Expert
 Rusty Sachs, JD, DhE, MCFI emeritus, Founder, Master Instruction, Inc.
 Don Steinman, ATP, CFII, Captain, American Airlines
 Donna Wilt, Ph.D., ATP, CFII, WIlt Aviation Consulting, LLC

Structure

The AMCC consists of the following seven sections (each containing principles and sample recommended practices):

 General Responsibilities of Aviators
 Passengers and People on the Surface
 Training and Proficiency
 Security
 Environmental Issues
 Use of Technology
 Advancement and Promotion of General Aviation

For each aspect, the Code of Conduct covers governing principles (e.g., "minimize the discharge of fuel, oil, and other chemicals into the environment") and lays out specific practical recommendations (e.g., "Use a Gasoline Analysis Test Separator jar for all fuel sampling). Where applicable, sourced commentary and annotations are used to substantiate principles and recommendations, and to provide drafting considerations.

Recognizing the need for early socialization, recommendations for integrating the Code of Conduct into flight training (including sample lesson plans) are collected in Notes For Instructors.

The Code of Conduct is intended to be specialized by aircraft operation and to evolve over time and place.

Foreign-language translations incorporate national and regionally-specific practices and regulations.

Notes for Prospective Implementers provides guidelines and resources for individuals and organizations adopting the Code of Conduct.

Flight Safety in the Drone Age is organized in five sections: (1) General Education and Preparation, (2) Preflight Operations, (3) In-flight Operations, (4) Post-flight Operations, and (5) Aviation Community.

Adoption

In the United States, the Federal Aviation Administration includes links to the Code of Conduct in their list of online resources.

Other users and promoters of the Code of Conduct include major aircraft type clubs, air carriers, flight schools, insurers, manufacturers, and other general aviation players, including:
 Avemco Insurance Company
 Cessna Owners Organization
 Center for the Study of Ethics in the Professions, Illinois Institute of Technology
 Cirrus Owners and Pilots Association
 Civil Air Patrol
 Flight Design
 Gleim
 International Helicopter Safety Team
 Mooney International Corporation
 National Association of Flight Instructors
 Piper Owners Society
 Qatar Airlines
 United States Helicopter Safety Team

References

External links

General Aviation Pilot Resources
FAA Flight Safety: Teaching the AMCC to kids
AOPA: Model code of conduct issued for flight instructors
FAA Aviation Instructor's Handbook p.7-6

Codes of conduct
General aviation
Aviation safety
Flight training